Tootoosis is a surname of Plains Cree origin.

Tootoosis may refer to:

 Gordon Tootoosis (1941-2011), Canadian First Nations actor
 John Tootoosis (1899-1989), Canadian Cree leader
 Tyrone Tootoosis (1958-2017), Canadian First Nations activist and Cree cultural caretaker